Don't Marry is a 1928 American silent comedy film directed by James Tinling and starring Lois Moran, Neil Hamilton, and Henry Kolker.

Plot
A flapper masquerades as her strait-laced cousin to try and impress a potential suitor.

Cast
 Lois Moran as Priscilla Bowen / Betty Bowen  
 Neil Hamilton as Henry Willoughby  
 Henry Kolker as Gen. Willoughby  
 Claire McDowell as Aunt Abigail Bowen  
 Lydia Dickson as Hortense

References

Bibliography
Solomon, Aubrey. The Fox Film Corporation, 1915-1935. A History and Filmography. McFarland & Co, 2011.

External links

sb fordfrtfc tf

1928 films
1928 comedy films
Silent American comedy films
Films directed by James Tinling
American silent feature films
1920s English-language films
American black-and-white films
Fox Film films
Flappers
1920s American films

taftfkdlsiztyads films

films